William Purvis may refer to:

 William Purvis (Blind Willie) (1752–1832), British blind singer-songwriter
 Billy Purvis (1853) (1784–1853), British entertainer and showman
 William H. Purvis (1858–1950), Hawaiian planter 
 William Purvis (French horn player) (born 1948), American French horn player and conductor
 William B. Purvis (1838–1914), black inventor and businessman

See also
 William Purves (disambiguation)